Urnyak (Ürnäk) is a rural locality (a selo) in Kazansky Selsoviet, Alsheyevsky District, Bashkortostan, Russia. The population was 149 as of 2010. There are 3 streets.

Geography 
Urnyak is located 20 km northwest of Rayevsky (the district's administrative centre) by road. Bayazitovo is the nearest rural locality.

References 

Rural localities in Alsheyevsky District